Mangarinus waterousi is a species of goby native to fresh and brackish waters of Japan, the Philippines, Indonesia, Palau and Micronesia.  This species grows to a length of  SL.  This species is the only known member of its genus. The specific name honours the Medical Corps (United States Army) physician Willard H. Waterous (1890-1964) who was a friend of the author, A. W. Herre, and who allowed him to use the Hacienda Waterous on Mindoro, where he collected the type.

References

Gobiidae
Monotypic fish genera
Fish described in 1943